is a Japanese noise punk band. Their name means "Greasy Octopus". A notable oddity is that none of Aburadako's albums have titles and are only distinguished by their packages. In September 2007, Rolling Stone Japan rated their 1985 studio album at No. 55 on its list of the "100 Greatest Japanese Rock Albums of All Time".

Discography

Singles
 'Aburadako / Yokujitsu' (9/8/2002) - This is a privately copied CD-R recording of their performance and called "CD-R"
 'Aburadako / Yokujitsu' (1/24/2004) - This is called "Kami-jake" because of its paper packaging.

Albums
Each album is titled Aburadako. They are differentiated primarily by their cover. Catalogue numbers are provided by the respective record companies. The 2008 compilation of the band's early work from 1983 to 1985 breaks this trend.

 Aburadako (8/?/1983) - The debut album is a 7-inch sonosheet and is called "ADK Sono-sheet".
 Aburadako (9/?/1984) - This is a 12-inch LP referred to as "ADK 12 inch"
 Aburadako (8/?/1985) - The package is a photo of a tree in the sunset, called "Ki-ban". TOKUMA JAPAN　TKCA-70827
 Aburadako (12/?/1986) - The package is navy blue, called "Ao-ban". TOKUMA JAPAN　TKCA-70828
 Aburadako (4/?/1989) - The package is a photo of a turtle, called "Kame-ban". TOKUMA JAPAN　TKCA-70829
 Aburadako (1/?/1996) - The package is a photo of a man holding a fish, called "Tsuri-ban"
 Aburadako (12/?/1999) - The package is a drawing of a man, called "OK-ban".  KING Record　KICS 521
 Aburadako (10/25/2000) - The package is a photo of a full moon, called "Tsuki-ban". MIDI　MDCL1397
 Aburadako (??/??/2002) - DIWPHALANX　PX-115
 Aburadako (11/9/2004) - This package is a dark tunnel with a light at the end P-vine　PCD-5860
 Aburadako (??/??/2008) - The package is a photo of a boat on water, called "Fune". P-vine　PCD-18532
 Aburadako (??/??/2008) - "ADK 1983-1985". OKRecords OK-0007 / P-vine PCD-93130.

References

External links
 Aburadako Official website
 Some Aburadako translated lyrics

Japanese rock music groups
Japanese punk rock groups